"Baby Please Don't Stop" is a song by Spice Girls member Emma Bunton, released on 27 February 2019 as the lead single from her fourth studio album, My Happy Place. It is Bunton's first solo single released in twelve years, the last being "All I Need to Know" in 2007. The single was written by Bunton, Patrick Mascall, and Paul Barry, while Paul Meehan and Brian Rawling handled the song's production.

Composition
"Baby Please Don't Stop" is a 1960s-inspired pop song with a length of three minutes. Musically, it contains sensual vocals over sugary production, with a tambourine-led chorus while the bridge stripping production down to the singer's voice and the bass guitar.

Critical reception
Official Charts gave the song a positive review, saying "This is a flirty, carefree and confident Emma who is taking control of the situation with the man of her dreams." Attitude called the song "another slice of the smooth '60s-styled radio pop that came to define Emma's solo sound in the early to mid-noughties". Mike Nied of Idolator called the song "infectious and with plenty of replay factor".

Live performances
Bunton performed the song on BBC The One Show.

Music videos
Two music videos have been produced for the single. The official music video premiered on 27 February 2019. It features the singer on the set of a photoshoot with her family and dog, while trying on outfits and drinking champagne.
Almost a month later, on 21 March 2019, a second music video has been uploaded and released to the singers' channel. Though sublabelled as the vertical video, it is not a vertical version of the official video produced for mobile devices and other social media. Instead it's an original different video with all new shots. In this video the singer is standing in front of a blue colored brick wall, dressed in a jeans jacket, smiling, dancing and singing along to the song.

Personnel
Adapted from Tidal.
Emma Bunton – lead artist, songwriter
Paul Barry – songwriter, guitar
Patrick Mascall – songwriter
Paul Meehan – producer, keyboards, programmer
Brian Rawling – producer
Hayley Sanderson – backing vocals
Adam Phillips – guitar
Jade Jones – vocal arranger
Ash Howes – engineer
Dick Beetham – engineer
Matt Furmidge – engineer

References

2019 singles
2019 songs
Emma Bunton songs
Songs written by Emma Bunton
Songs written by Paul Barry (songwriter)